Nevşehir Museum is in Nevşehir, Turkey

Nevşehir is the provincial center in the region which is the Capadocia of the antiquity and known for its fairy chimneys.

The former museum of Nevşehir was in a historical building which served from 1967 to 1987 when a new building was opened as a museum.

In the museum there are two halls one for the archaeology and one for the ethnography. 
In archaeology section items of Neolithic, Chalcolithic Bronz, Phrygia, Urartu, Hellenistic, Roman and Byzantine ages are exhibited. There are also some items from Iran, Mesopotamia and Cyprus  In ethnography section illumination tools, hand written books, weapons, local clothes hand works, ornaments, kitchen tools are displayed.

References

External links
For images

Buildings and structures in Nevşehir Province
Archaeological museums in Turkey
1987 establishments in Turkey
Museums established in 1987
Ethnographic museums in Turkey
Tourist attractions in Nevşehir Province